Distino di Belita (also known as Nova Sintra) is an album by Cesária Évora, released in 1990. It was co-produced by the Parisian label Mélodie. The album was a chart success in Europe.

It was her second album with Jose da Silva. Évora recorded with an electric band.

Track listing
"Bitina"
"Nova Sintra"
"Emigranti"
"Tanha"
"Salamansa"
"Odji Maguado"
"T'imbutchode"
"Distino Di Belita"
"Nova Sintra"
"Pontero"

References

External links

Cesária Évora albums
1990 albums